Artem Valeryevich Markelov (born 10 September 1994) is a Russian racing driver who last competed in the FIA Formula 2 Championship for HWA Team in 2020.

Career

Karting
Born in Moscow, Markelov began karting in 2006 and raced mostly in his native Russia for the majority of his karting career, working his way up through the junior ranks to progress into the KF2 category by 2010.

ADAC Formel Masters
In 2011, Markelov moved into open-wheel racing, competing in ADAC Formel Masters with Motopark Academy, taking eleven podiums in twenty-three races, including one win at Red Bull Ring. As a result, Markelov finished in fourth place in the final championship standings.

Formula Three

2011 
During the 2011 season, Markelov made his Formula Three debut, with Motopark, in the Hockenheimring round of the Formula 3 Euro Series.

2012 

Markelov and Motopark – now under the Lotus moniker – elected to compete in the German Formula Three Championship in 2012. He finished seventh in the standings, scoring three podiums, including sprint-race wins at Lausitz and Hockenheim.

2013 
Markelov stayed in the German series for another year in 2013, remaining with Motopark. He had eighteen podiums in twenty-three races, including wins in both main races at Lausitz. He finished as runner-up to his teammate Marvin Kirchhöfer.

GP2 Series / FIA Formula 2

2014 

Markelov made his GP2 Series debut in 2014 with Russian Time, where he joined Mitch Evans. Markelov had only one point-scoring finish at Spa, finishing the season 24th, twenty positions behind Evans in the drivers' championship.

2015 
Markelov and Evans remained with Russian Time in 2015. Markelov took his first podium at Spa, when he started from the 22nd position on the grid. He made the progress in the championship to the thirteenth place, being more consistent, but he was still eight positions behind the Evans in the standings.

2016 
Markelov continued to race with Russian Time in 2016, but this time he was joined in the team by Raffaele Marciello. Markelov claimed his first GP2 Series win in the feature race in Monaco, starting from the fifteenth starting position. But he wasn't stable as Marciello, finishing tenth in the drivers' championship.

2017
For the 2017 season, the GP2 Series was rebranded as the FIA Formula 2 Championship. While Markelov remained with Russian Time for his fourth consecutive season with the Dallara GP2/11 machinery, which was also the final year of use for the chassis in the championship, being joined by Luca Ghiotto. Markelov won the first race in the FIA Formula 2 Championship history. He also collected wins at Spielberg, Spa, Jerez and Abu Dhabi While it wasn't enough to prevent Charles Leclerc winning the drivers' championship, he brought the teams' championship to Russian Time with the help of Ghiotto.

2018

2019
Following the 2018 season, Markelov was left without a drive in the 2019 Formula 2 season after Russian Time withdrew from the series. However, following Jordan King's participation in the 2019 Indianapolis 500, Markelov was called up by MP Motorsport for the Monaco round as a one-off replacement. He scored points in both races, with a sixth place in the first race and a fourth place in the second race.

As a result of the weekend at Circuit de Spa-Francorchamps following the Lap 2 feature race crash that killed BWT Arden driver Anthoine Hubert, the team signed Markelov to finish out the season at Sochi and Abu Dhabi, although the car number changed from 19 to 22.

2020
In , Markelov continued to race in F2 with the same team, now HWA Racelab. He was joined by Giuliano Alesi, son of former Formula One driver Jean Alesi, who left Trident at the end of the 2019 season. However Markelov had a disappointing season scoring only 5 points compared to championship winner Mick Schumacher's 215.

Formula One
In February 2018, Markelov was announced as Renault development driver for the 2018 FIA Formula One World Championship and drove in an official Formula One session for the first time at the 2018 Russian Grand Prix. He then made an appearance for the team at the 2018 Abu Dhabi Young Driver Test.

Personal life
Markelov is married to former TV show host Katya Zhuzha. Their son Max was born in 2020. He is also the step father of Katya Zhuzha's child from another marriage, Nicole Markelova.

Racing record

Karting career summary

Racing career summary 

† As Markelov was a guest driver, he was ineligible for points.

Complete ADAC Formel Masters results 
(key) (Races in bold indicate pole position) (Races in italics indicate fastest lap)

Complete German Formula Three Championship results
(key) (Races in bold indicate pole position) (Races in italics indicate fastest lap)

Complete GP2 Series results
(key) (Races in bold indicate pole position) (Races in italics indicate fastest lap)

† Driver did not finish the race, but was classified as he completed over 90% of the race distance.

Complete Toyota Racing Series results
(key) (Races in bold indicate pole position) (Races in italics indicate fastest lap)

Complete FIA Formula 2 Championship results
(key) (Races in bold indicate pole position) (Races in italics indicate points for the fastest lap of top ten finishers)

† Driver did not finish the race, but was classified as he completed over 90% of the race distance.

Complete Formula One participations
(key) (Races in bold indicate pole position; races in italics indicate fastest lap)

Complete Super Formula results
(key) (Races in bold indicate pole position) (Races in italics indicate fastest lap)

References

External links

 
 
 

1994 births
Living people
Sportspeople from Moscow
Russian racing drivers
ADAC Formel Masters drivers
Formula 3 Euro Series drivers
German Formula Three Championship drivers
GP2 Series drivers
Toyota Racing Series drivers
FIA Formula 2 Championship drivers
Motopark Academy drivers
Russian Time drivers
MP Motorsport drivers
Arden International drivers
HWA Team drivers
Super Formula drivers
Team LeMans drivers
M2 Competition drivers
Virtuosi Racing drivers
ISport International drivers